The 1983–84 season was Real Madrid Club de Fútbol's 82nd season in existence and the club's 53rd consecutive season in the top flight of Spanish football.

Summary
This season is best remembered for the debut of popular young playmaker Emilio Butragueño and his "La Quinta del Buitre" (Chendo, Sanchis, Martín Vázquez, Pardeza and Michel) a group of teenage players climbing from its reserve team Castilla towards the first team starting a new club era. Owing to financial worries Presidente Luis de Carlos with a narrow space for star players transfers in the club, chose to support rejuvenate the squad for this campaign aimed by successful seasons of basque sides Real Sociedad and Athletic Bilbao with low profile Spanish players being majority in their squads. However, for the second time the club offered a contract to Brazilian midfielder Zico being surpassed in the race by Udinese Calcio which bought him from Flamengo.

Shockingly, the team was early eliminated in the UEFA Cup first round by Czech underdogs side Sparta Prague. Di Stefano managed the team to clinch the first spot of League table for several rounds until March when a 1–1 draw at Pamplona against Osasuna and lost a decisive match at San Mamés against Athletic Bilbao with a 0–1 score collapsed its chances to take the title in favor of basque side Athletic Bilbao despite the two teams finished on League table tied on points. Meanwhile, in 1983–84 Copa del Rey the squad was defeated in semi-finals by, again, Athletic Bilbao after a penalty shoot-out series only three days after the basque team took the title away of Real Madrid on a tie-breaker for the second consecutive year.

During May, the squad was early eliminated by Atlético Madrid in the 1984 Copa de la Liga first round. Forward Juanito won the Pichichi trophy with 17 goals scored in League, tied along Jorge da Silva. After two years as head coach and no-titles clinched, Argentine head coach Alfredo Di Stéfano was sacked by President Luis de Carlos towards the end of campaign.

Squad

Transfers

Competitions

Primera División

Position by round

League table

Matches

Copa del Rey

Second round

Third round

Fourth round

Round of 16

Quarter-finals

Semi-finals

Copa de la Liga

First round

UEFA Cup

First round

Statistics

Players statistics

See also
La Quinta del Buitre

References

External links
 BDFútbol

Real Madrid CF seasons
Real Madrid